Moscow Design Museum is a private cultural organization founded in May, 2012. It was created by a team of art historians, designers, journalists, curators and architects.

The main objectives of the project are to promote Russian design, educate the public about visual culture and further international cooperation.

The museum was originally planned to be housed in a refurbished bus, but in July, 2012 the Moscow Department of Culture gave the museum an exhibition space in CEH “Moscow Manege”, in the center of Moscow, across from the Kremlin.

The bus will be used as a mobile exhibition hall for travelling multimedia projects.

Museum Opening
Moscow Design Museum opened in the end of November, 2012 in CEH “Manege”.
The museum's visual identity was designed by the Dutch creative agency Lava Design

The first exhibition is “Soviet design 1950-1980’s”.

Articles on Moscow Design Museum
Article on Moscow Design Museum in The New York Times Style Magazine.

Article on Moscow Design Museum in RIA Novosti.

References

External links
 Official museum website

Art museums and galleries in Moscow
Design museums
Museums established in 2012
2012 establishments in Russia